Maria Jeanette Lindström is a Swedish singer, composer and lyricist. She grew up in Östersund and Ås in the Jämtland region of Sweden.

Career
Lindström made her recording debut for Caprice Records with Another Country in 1995, the year she was awarded the Jazz in Sweden prize. Two more albums followed for the same label. In 2003 she began a collaboration with the Bonnier Amigo Music Group on the album Walk. The album and its sequel, In the Middle of This Riddle, were warmly received by audiences and critics in Sweden and abroad. On the album Whistling Away the Dark, she recorded with Palle Danielsson, Bobo Stenson, Jonas Östholm, and Magnus Öström—a side project apart from her band. In 2007 the song Leaf, from In the Middle of This Riddle, was remixed by King Britt, a DJ and record producer from Philadelphia, and a track from the album was chosen for the compilation series Saint-Germain-des-Prés Café (Volume 7). Her album Attitude & Orbit Control was released in October 2009. She received a Swedish Grammis at the awards ceremony in January 2010.

She has worked with pianist Steve Dobrogosz and the group ONCE with bassist Anders Jormin. She has appeared as guest soloist in small groups, big bands, and chamber and symphony orchestras. She has toured around the world in addition to her home country of Sweden.

Discography
 Another Country (Caprice, 1995)
 I Saw You (Caprice, 1997)
 Sinatra/Weill (Caprice, 1999)
 Feathers with Steve Dobrogosz (Prophone, 2000)
 Walk (Amigo, 2003)
 In the Middle of This Riddle (Amigo, 2005)
 Whistling Away the Dark (Amigo, 2006)
 Attitude & Orbit Control (Diesel Music, 2009)

External links
Official website

References

Randy McElligott, Jazz Review.com, 2003, https://web.archive.org/web/20030928111815/http://www.jazzreview.com/cdreview.cfm?ID=5221,
Alex Dutilh, Jazzman – le journal de tous les jazz, 2003/05 nr 91, page 48
Ulf Gustavsson, Upsala Nya Tidning, 2003-02-19, Nöje page A11
Stefan Herdell, LT, 2005-05-06, https://web.archive.org/web/20050507152932/http://www.ltz.se/artikel_standard.php?id=232982&avdelning_1=124&avdelning_2=149
Tor Hammerø, Puls, 2005-05-06, http://www.puls.no/13375.html,
Dan Backman, Svenska Dagbladet, 2005-05-13, http://www.svd.se/kulturnoje/musik/artikel_30890.svd,
John Kelman, all about jazz, 2005-12-30, http://www.allaboutjazz.com/php/article.php?id=20223,
Joe Montague, Jazz Review.com, 2007, https://web.archive.org/web/20090922101226/http://www.jazzreview.com/article/review-5665.html,

1971 births
Living people
21st-century Swedish singers
21st-century Swedish women singers